Gina Cerminara (April 11, 1914 – April 1984) was an American author in the fields of parapsychology, spirituality and reincarnation. She was born in Milwaukee and received BA, MA, and Ph.D. degrees in psychology from the University of Wisconsin–Madison. Her years of research regarding Edgar Cayce led her to publish a book about reincarnation in 1950 titled Many Mansions. Her other books on reincarnation include The World Within, Many Lives, Many Loves and Insights for the Age of Aquarius.

Publications 
Many Mansions (1950), numerous reprints

References

External links
 Gina Germinara details at Penguin Publications
 Gina Germinara's interview of Walden Welch

1914 births
1984 deaths
American spiritual writers
Parapsychologists
Reincarnation
 University of Wisconsin–Madison College of Letters and Science alumni
20th-century American non-fiction writers
20th-century American women writers
American women non-fiction writers